The Renyitan Dam is a dam in Fanlu Township, Chiayi County, Taiwan.

History
The dam was initially constructed in April 1980 on Renyi Lake and was opened in October 1987.

Technical specifications
The water intake for the reservoir inside the dam comes from Bazhang River. The reservoir has a full capacity of 29,110,000 m3 and an effective capacity of 27,310,000 m3. The reservoir maximum surface area is 2.32 km2 with a maximum depth of 105 m.

Transportation
The dam is accessible east from Chiayi Station of Taiwan Railways.

See also
 List of dams and reservoirs in Taiwan

References

1987 establishments in Taiwan
Dams in Chiayi County
Dams completed in 1987